Imma Monsó (born in 1959 in Lleida, Catalonia) is a Spanish fiction writer.

Monsó is known mainly for her humorous and poignant novels and for blending an absurdist wit with a profound tenderness for her very singular characters. Monso is graduated from University of Barcelona, Spain and Caen University in France. She is a high-school teacher and writes for the main Spanish and Catalan newspapers like El País and La Vanguardia. All her literary works has been translated into Spanish, and most of them to several languages. She has received numerous awards for her literary works.

Published works

Novels
No se sap mai (One never knows)  (1996)
Com unes vacances (Like a holiday)  (1998)
Tot un caràcter (A total character) (2000)
Un home de paraula (A man with a word) (2006)

Short story and essay collections
Marxem, papà, aquí no ens hi volen. (Go on, daddy, we’re not welcome here)(2004),
Millor que no m’ho expliquis (Better if you don’t tell me) (2003)
Hi són, però els veus (They are here, but you can’t see them)(2003)
I Was Walking, Barcelona Metropolis, 2010.

Children fiction
L'escola Estrambota (The Strambot School) (2005)

Honours and awards
1996: "Premi Ribera d'Ebre" al libro de relatos  Si és no és
1997: Tigre Juan Award from the Fundación Alarcos Llorach, for her novel Nunca se sabe
1998: "Premi Prudenci Bertrana" a la novela Com unes vacances
1999: "Premi Cavall verd, de l'Associació d'Escriptors en Llengua Catalana" a Com unes vacances
2003: "Premio Com Radio" al libro de relatos Millor que no m’ho expliquis
2004: "Premio Ciutat de Barcelona" al libro de relatos  Millor que no m’ho expliquis
2007: "Premi Maria Àngels Anglada" a la novela Un home de paraula
2007: "Premio Salambó" a la novela Un home de paraula
2007: "Premio Internacional Terenci Moix" a la novela Un home de paraula

Bibliography
Imma Monsó:La narrativa de la ironia i diferència. Vic (Barcelona): Eumo & Universitat de Vic, ‘Capsa de Pandora’ Feminist Studies Series. .
Author:	M. Lunati, Senior Lecturer in Hispanic Studies, Cardiff University, GB:

References

External links
Official site

Catalan writers

1959 births
Living people
Writers from Catalonia
Women writers from Catalonia
People from Lleida